Fabio Mussi (born 22 January 1948) is an Italian politician, formerly Minister of University and Research in the Prodi II Cabinet. A former member of the Italian Communist Party and then Democrats of the Left, he became a lead founding member of the Democratic Left. Mussi was then a member of Left Ecology Freedom (SEL), which the Democratic Left merged into in 2010, before becoming a member of the Italian Left (SI) after SEL was dissolved in 2017.

Career
Born in Piombino, Tuscany, he joined the Italian Communist Party (PCI) in 1966, being initially active at university level whilst studying at the Scuola Normale Superiore in Pisa. In 1973, he graduated in Philosophy at the University of Pisa, (he never graduated at Scuola Normale Superiore di Pisa) and soon joined its administrative staff. He also became a member of the PCI Central Committee in 1979, charged with cultural and propaganda tasks and bestowed with an editor's position at Rinascita. He was regional secretary of the party in Calabria (1980–1984), and after that a member of the PCI National Directory. From 1986, he was co-editor of L'Unità.

Favorable to the turn towards democratic socialism in the PCI, he joined the Democratic Party of the Left, direct successor of the PCI, which itself became Democrats of the Left in 1998, also serving in the Italian Parliament from 1992 to 2008. Confirmed as deputy for his fourth time at the 2006 elections, Mussi then served as senior vice-president of the Chamber of Deputies and Minister for the University and Research in the Italian government.

During the 2007 Democrats of the Left convention, he headed the left-wing minority (the so-called correntone), which was opposed the creation of the Democratic Party. During the convention he announced his opposition to join the Democratic Party once it was founded, and instead created a party called Democratic Left, of which he was the national coordinator. Mussi left the leadership of his party following the party's defeat in the 2008 general election, as part of The Left - The Rainbow alliance, being replaced by Claudio Fava.

References

External links
"Q&A: Fabio Mussi", Nature

1948 births
Living people
People from Piombino
Italian Communist Party politicians
20th-century Italian politicians
Democratic Left (Italy) politicians
Democrats of the Left politicians
Democratic Party of the Left politicians
Left Ecology Freedom politicians
Italian Left politicians
University of Pisa alumni